MBC TV may refer to either of the following television channels:

 MBC TV (India)
 MBC TV (South Korean TV channel)